"Let's Get Together" is a science fiction short story by American writer Isaac Asimov.  It was originally published in the February 1957 issue of Infinity Science Fiction, and included in the collections The Rest of the Robots (1964) and The Complete Robot (1982).  The robots in this tale are very different from Asimov's norm, being quite willing to work as war machines.  The tale is also based on a continuation of Cold War hostility, rather than the peaceful unified world of most of the robot stories.

Plot summary
The Cold War has endured for a century and an uneasy peace between "Us" and "Them"  exists. A secret agent arrives in America from Moscow with the story that robots identical to humans in appearance and behaviour have been developed by Them and that ten have already been infiltrated into America. When they get together, they will trigger a nuclear-level explosion (they are components of a total conversion bomb).

A conference of "Our" greatest minds in all the branches of natural science is hastily convened to decide how to detect these robots and how to catch up on this technology. Almost too late, the head of the Bureau of Robotics realises that Their plan exactly anticipates this: the infiltrator robots have replaced scientists invited to this conference, and while the explosion would kill a relatively small number of people, it would precisely include "Our" top scientists, and therefore all the scientists arriving to the conference must pass a security check before they are allowed to get together.

His guess is proven correct almost immediately, as ten of the scientists en route explode via self-destruct charges. However, the Bureau head wonders how They could have realized and acted upon the discovery of the plan so quickly. The truth dawns on him; he pulls a blaster and blows the secret agent's head off. The body slumps forward leaking "not blood, but high-grade machine oil."

External links 
 
 

Robot series short stories by Isaac Asimov
1957 short stories
Works originally published in Infinity Science Fiction